Gordon Edwards (born 1940) is a Canadian scientist and nuclear consultant.

Gordon Edwards may also refer to:
Gordon Edwards (born 1947), a British cricketer and engineer
Gordon Cameron Edwards (1866–1946), Canadian politician
Charles Gordon Edwards (1878–1931), an American political figure
James Gordon Edwards (1867–1925), an American film director, producer and writer
J. Gordon Edwards (1919–2004), an American entomologist 
Gordon John Edwards (1947–2003), a British musician (The Kinks, Pretty Things)
Gordon H. Edwards (born 1946), an American bassist, founder of Stuff